Jean Négroni (4 December 1920 – 28 May 2005) was a French actor and theatre director particularly known for his voice work, such as his role as the narrator in La Jetée (1962).

Biography
Jean Négroni was educated in theater by Albert Camus, and was an early companion of Jean Vilar at the Théâtre National Populaire and at the Festival d'Avignon.

Négroni's career was marked by his portrayal of Robespierre — first on an episode of the television program , and later in the theater under the direction of Robert Hossein.

Négroni provided the voice of the narrator in La Jetée (1962) and also narrated Pierre Henry's concrete music album L'Apocalypse de Jean (1968).

Partial filmography
 Premier rendez-vous (1941) - Un élève du collège (uncredited)
 Les inconnus dans la maison (1942) - (uncredited)
 Les cadets de l'océan (1945)
 Patrie (1946) - Un officier espagnol
 Un certain Monsieur Jo (1958)
 La Passe du diable (1958) - Récitant / Narrator (voice)
 Enclosure (1960) - David
 La Jetée (1962, Short) - Narrator (voice)
 L'escalier (1964) - Récitant / Narrator (voice)
 La Cage de verre (1965) - Pierre
 La Dame de pique (1965) - Comte de Saint-Germain
 Paris brûle-t-il? (1966) - Villon (uncredited)
 Le deuxième souffle (1966) - L'homme
 Dieu a choisi Paris (1969) - Récitant (voice)
 L'Alpagueur (1976) - Spitzer
 Pourquoi? (1977) - Le médecin
 I as in Icarus (1979) - Carlos de Palma, l'homme au parapluie
 Noces de sève (1979) - Jérôme Capdevielle
 Lénine (1982) - Vladimir Lenin
 Gramps Is in the Resistance (1983) - Récitant / Narrator (voice)
 Love Rites (1987) - Récitant / Narrator (voice)

External links
 

1920 births
2005 deaths
French male film actors
French theatre directors
People from Constantine, Algeria
French male voice actors
Migrants from French Algeria to France